The South East Asian Table Tennis Championships is a biennial table tennis tournament regarded as a regional championships by International Table Tennis Federation (ITTF). From 1998, the tournament was organised by the Asian Table Tennis Union (ATTU) and South East Asian Table Tennis Association(SEATTA).

Editions

South East Asian Table Tennis Championships

Results of Individual and Team Events

Winners of South East Asian Championships

Medal table (2010 - Now)

Some medals of 2010 & 2014 are unknown

See also
 World Table Tennis Championships
 Asian Table Tennis Championships
 Asian Table Tennis Union
 List of table tennis players

References

 
Table tennis competitions
Table tennis in Asia
Recurring sporting events established in 1998